Jaan Pöör (born 17 December 1950 in Loksa) is an Estonian politician. He was a member of VIII Riigikogu.

Pöör graduated from Tallinn University of Technology as an electrical engineer. From 1990 until 1995, he was the mayor of Alatskivi Parish. Jaan Pöör is a member of the People's Union.

References

Living people
1950 births
People's Union of Estonia politicians
Members of the Riigikogu, 1995–1999
Members of the Riigikogu, 1999–2003
Mayors of places in Estonia
Tallinn University of Technology alumni
People from Loksa